Nagula Chavithi (Telugu: నాగుల చవితి) is an auspicious day to observe Naga Puja. Nagula Chavithi is observed on the fourth day (Chaturthi) after Deepavali Amavasya during Karthika masam. Nag Panchami and Nagasashti are observed after Naga Chaturthi. In some parts of Andhra Pradesh and Tamilnadu it is also celebrated in the month of Sravana masam.

Nagula Chavithi, a festival to worship Nag Devatas (Serpent Gods), is mainly a women's festival. Nagula Chavithi is observed by married women for their wellbeing of their children. During the Chavithi festival, women keep fast and observe Naga Puja. Devotees offer milk and dry fruits to Sarpa Devata at the Valmeekam or Putta (snake pits). On Nag Chaturthi day, Ashtanag (eight hooded cobra) is worshipped.

Nagula Chavithi in Kartika masam is a major festival in Andhra Pradesh and some parts of  Tamilnadu. The rituals and puja procedures are different from place to place. Some people place Naga devatha idol at home and perform puja. But in some places, devotees go to 'Putta' (Snake pit) and offer naivedyam and perform other pujas. 

People perform puja to puttas or ant hills (which are homes for snakes) with milk, kumkum, turmeric, vibhuti, offering made of sweets made by a mixture of jaggery and black sesame seeds and also with jaggery and white sesame seeds, mixture of unboiled rice and black sesame seeds and finally, eggs. People drop these things into the ant hill.

People also light diyas near the ant hill and offer flowers to it. This ritual is done facing east and usually in auspicious time of the day.

After finishing the offerings, people take a little bit of soil from the ant hill and put it on the back of their ears. People believe that celebrating naagula chavithi removes all tensions in their household and family life. People usually do these rituals to ant hills present in temples or any other place in their locality where ant hills are present. 

The popular legend associated with Nagula Chavithi in Telugu Hindu culture suggests that on the day Lord Shiva drank the poison Halahala or Kalkuta to save the universe during the famous incident of Samudra Manthan.

Pujas and prayers are also held in Naga temples across the state.

Nowadays, Nagula Chavithi day is noted for the practice of offering milk and eggs to the snakes, especially cobras near snake pits. Snake charmers also bring cobras to villages and towns which are fed with milk by devotees.

Worship of Nagas is a constant reminder to humans to live in harmony with Nature. And the ideal way to worship Nagas is by protecting the forests and grooves that are home of snakes and other animals.

Criticism from animal rights activists 
Animal rights activists criticize this festival for propagating a regressive myth that snakes drink milk. "Snakes are not mammals. They are reptiles. Mammals can generally digest milk, and some, in fact, survive on it. For snakes, this is biologically impossible. Snakes in general can open three times the actual size of their mouth and consume prey directly. They just don't drink milk. But the charmers usually captured the snake, broke the fangs off of it (called defanging), stitched its mouth in the sides and left a hole in the front. After this, they starved the snakes for 30-45 days to the point of dehydration and brought it to the festival of Naga Panchami. People would offer various food items including milk, which to an extremely dehydrated snake with only one hole in its mouth, appears much like water to a person stranded in the desert. So it would lap it up." Animal rights activists point out that the milk that is wasted here is obtained from cruel practices in the dairy industry. Pouring milk in the snake pit will also cause problems for the snakes since, often, the pits are filled with milk.

References

Hindu festivals
Religious festivals in India